The second annual MTV Video Music Awards Latinoamérica 2003 took place on October 23, 2003, in Miami at the Jackie Gleason Theater for the second time in a row.

Diego Luna hosted the awards alone for the first time. He previously co-hosted the 2002 edition.

Nominations
Winners in bold.

Artist of the Year
 Café Tacuba
 Juanes
 La Ley
 Maná
 Molotov
 Natalia Lafourcade

Video of the Year
 Café Tacuba — "EO (El Sonidero)" 
 Gustavo Cerati — "Cosas Imposibles"
 Juanes — "Fotografía (featuring Nelly Furtado)"
 La Ley — "Ámate y Sálvate"
 Molotov — "Frijolero"

Best Solo Artist
 Diego Torres
 Gustavo Cerati
 Natalia Lafourcade
 Ricky Martin
 Vicentico

Best Group or Duet
 Café Tacuba
 La Ley
 La Oreja de Van Gogh
 Maná
 Molotov

Best Pop Artist
 Diego Torres
 Natalia Lafourcade
 Paulina Rubio
 Ricky Martin
 Thalía

Best Rock Artist
 Gustavo Cerati
 Jaguares
 Juanes
 La Ley
 Maná

Best Alternative Artist
 Café Tacuba
 El Otro Yo
 Kinky
 Molotov
 Plastilina Mosh

Best Independent Artist
 Hermanos Brothers
 Miranda!
 Panda
 Totus Toss
 Volován
No public voting

Best Pop Artist — International
 Avril Lavigne
 Christina Aguilera
 Justin Timberlake
 Madonna
 Robbie Williams

Best Rock Artist — International
 Audioslave
 Coldplay
 Evanescence
 Linkin Park
 Radiohead

Best New Artist — International
 Audioslave
 Beyoncé
 Evanescence
 t.A.T.u.
 The White Stripes

Best Artist — Mexico
 Café Tacuba
 Maná
 Mœnia
 Molotov
 Natalia Lafourcade

Best New Artist — Mexico
 Cartel de Santa
 Inspector
 Natalia Lafourcade
 Panteón Rococó
 Qbo

Best Artist — Central
 Aterciopelados
 Juanes
 La Ley
 Líbido
 Los Prisioneros

Best New Artist — Central
 Coni Lewin
 Marciano
 Pettinellis
 TK
 Zen

Best Artist — Argentina
 Babasónicos
 Bersuit Vergarabat
 Gustavo Cerati
 Kevin Johansen
 Vicentico

Best New Artist — Argentina
 Carajo
 Emme
 Kevin Johansen
 Miranda!
 Vicentico

Performances

Pre-show
 Elán — "Midnight"
 Kevin Johansen — "Sur o No Sur"
 Qbo — "No Más"
 Líbido — "Frágil"
 Catupecu Machu — "Y Lo Que Quiero Es Que Pises sin el Suelo"

Main show
 Álex Lora, Andrea Echeverri, Charly Alberti, Jorge González, Juanes, Plastilina Mosh, Ricky Martin and Vicentico as "Los Black Stripes" — "We Are South American Rockers" / "Bolero Falaz" / "Gimme Tha Power" / "Livin' la Vida Loca" / "El Matador"
 Alejandro Sanz — "No Es Lo Mismo"
 Korn — "Right Now"
 La Ley and Ely Guerra — "Ámate y Sálvate" and "El Duelo"
 Dido — "White Flag"
 Café Tacuba — "Eres" and "Cero y Uno"
 The Mars Volta — "Drunkship of Lanterns"
 Gustavo Cerati — "Artefacto"
 Natalia Lafourcade and Control Machete — "En el 2000" and "Bien, Bien"
 Iggy Pop and Sum 41 — "Little Know It All" and "Lust for Life"

Appearances
 Madonna — introduced the audience to the show
 Britney Spears, Erik Estrada, Daisy Fuentes, Iggy Pop and Sum 41 — appeared in the Opening Sketch
 Diego Maradona — appeared during Diego Luna's opening monologue
 Álex Lora, Juanes and Charly Alberti — presented Best Group or Duet
 Andrea Echeverri (from Aterciopelados) and Dido — introduced Alejandro Sanz
 Patricia Velásquez and Sum 41 — presented Best Pop Artist
 Fher, Alex and Sergio (from Maná) — presented Best Rock Artist—International
 Daniela Cicarelli, Amelia Vega and Elsa Benítez — presented Best Rock Artist
 Kelly Osbourne and Molotov — introduced Korn
 Catupecu Machu and Leticia Bredice — presented Best New Artist—Argentina
 Amaia and Pablo (from La Oreja de Van Gogh) and Alfonso and "Midi" (from Mœnia) — introduced La Ley
 Elan and María Jimena Pereyra — introduced Dido
 Sofía Mulánovich, Chris Pontius, Steve-O and Manny Puig — presented Best Artist—Central
 Gustavo Cerati — introduced Café Tacuba
 Daisy Fuentes and Deborah Ombres — presented Best Solo Artist
 Zack de la Rocha — introduced The Mars Volta
 The cast of Dirty Sanchez and Fabiola Campomanes — presented Best Alternative Artist
 Natalia Lafourcade and Gil and Ulises (from Kinky) — introduced Gustavo Cerati
 Martha Higareda and Alfonso Herrera — introduced Natalia Lafourcade
 Diego Torres, Esther Cañadas and Robi Rosa — presented Video of the Year
 Alejandro Sanz — presented Artist of the Year

References

Latin American music
MTV Video Music Awards
2003 music awards
2003 in Florida